Perlohmanniidae is a family of mites belonging to the order Sarcoptiformes.

Genera:
 Hololohmannia Kubota & Aoki, 1998
 Perlohmannia Berlese, 1916

References

Sarcoptiformes